St Ann's Ground was a cricket ground at Barnes, Surrey (now in the London Borough of Richmond upon Thames).  In 1889 the Lyric Club played the Marylebone Cricket Club in a non first-class match.  The only first-class match held at the ground came in 1890 when the Lyric Club played the touring Australians, which the Lyric Club won by 96 runs.  The final important match at the ground, in 1892, was between the Lyric Club and the Marylebone Cricket Club.  The ground was located within the grounds of St Ann's House, which in the early 1900s it was built over.  The approximate location of the house today would be near Lyric Road and St Ann's Road, which are near the River Thames.

References

External links
St Ann's Ground on CricketArchive
St Ann's Ground on Cricinfo

1889 establishments in England
Sport in Barnes, London
Cricket grounds in London
Cricket grounds in Surrey
Defunct cricket grounds in England
Defunct sports venues in London
History of the London Borough of Richmond upon Thames
Sport in the London Borough of Richmond upon Thames
Sports venues completed in 1889